Kenfield Nunatak is an isolated nunatak which lies about  southeast of the head of Cosgrove Ice Shelf and  east-northeast of Pryor Cliff, at the extreme northern end of the Hudson Mountains, Antarctica. It was mapped by the United States Geological Survey (USGS) from ground surveys and U.S. Navy air photos, 1960–66, and was named by the Advisory Committee on Antarctic Names for Richard E. Kenfield, a USGS topographic engineer working from Byrd Station in the 1963–64 season.

References

Hudson Mountains
Nunataks of Ellsworth Land
Volcanoes of Ellsworth Land